Andersen Monogatari may refer to:

 The World of Hans Christian Andersen, a 1968 Toei Animation feature film
 Andersen Monogatari (TV series), a 1971 Mushi Production television series

Ja:アンデルセン物語